Robert Barclay (1774–1811), was a lieutenant-colonel.

Barclay entered the army as an ensign in the 38th Regiment on 28 October 1789, and embarked with his regiment for the East Indies, where he signalised himself in most of the actions fought there in 1793. He was so distinguished by his talents and courage that he was promoted to a lieutenancy on 31 May 1793, and to a company on 8 April 1795, and on both occasions out of his turn. Having been taken prisoner by the enemy, he suffered much in captivity, and in the year following his promotion he returned to England. Though entitled to six months' leave, he hastened to rejoin his regiment, then in the West Indies.

His distinguished qualities having become known to Lieutenant-general Sir John Moore, he was promoted to a majority in the 52nd on 17 September 1803, and on 29 May 1806 to a lieutenant-colonelcy. In 1808 he accompanied Sir John Moore in the expedition to Sweden, and afterwards to Portugal. He was mentioned in despatches for his distinguished conduct during the Battle of the Côa on 24 June 1810. He afterwards commanded a brigade, at the head of which, when charging the French on the heights of Busaco, he received a wound below the left knee. For his conduct at Busaco he was again honourably mentioned in despatches. His wound obliged him to leave the service, and he died from the effects of it on 11 May 1811.

References

1774 births
1811 deaths
18th-century English people
19th-century English people
British Army personnel of the Napoleonic Wars
British Army personnel of the Peninsular War
British military personnel killed in action in the Napoleonic Wars